Emmy Bronsard (born October 13, 2004) is a Canadian ice dancer. With her former skating partner, Aissa Bouaraguia, she is the 2020 Canadian junior national champion, the 2019 JGP Croatia bronze medallist, and finished in the top nine at the 2020 World Junior Championships.

Personal life 
Bronsard was born on October 16, 2004, in Lévis, Quebec. She enjoys cooking, ballet, alpine skiing, and music. Bronsard has an English bulldog named Hamilton. She can speak French. As of 2019, Bronsard is a student at Collège de Montréal.

Career

Early career 
Bronsard began skating in 2007 at Centre Gadbois in Montreal. She started training under Marie-France Dubreuil and Patrice Lauzon around 2012. Bronsard originally competed in ladies' singles and won several medals at Sectionals but never reached the Canadian Championships.

Bronsard began competing with Aissa Bouaraguia in ice dance in 2014. They are the 2016 Québec Sectionals juvenile silver medalists. During the 2016–17 season, Bronsard/Bouaraguia won pre-novice silver at the 2017 Skate Canada Challenge.

2018–2019 season 
After taking the 2017–18 season off to concentrate on singles, Bronsard/Bouaraguia returned to ice dance during the 2018–19 season. They bypassed competing in novices and skipped directly from pre-novice to junior.

Bronsard/Bouaraguia made their junior international debut on the Junior Grand Prix, placing fourth in the Czech Republic and sixth in Armenia. They then won silver at the 2019 Québec Sectionals held in November 2018. At the 2019 Skate Canada Challenge, Bronsard/Bouaraguia were fourth. They ended their season with a sixth-place finish at the 2019 Canadian Championships.

2019–2020 season 
Bronsard/Bouaraguia opened their season at the 2019 Lake Placid Ice Dance International, where they won silver behind Canadian teammates Nadiia Bashynska / Peter Beaumont. At their first Junior Grand Prix event, 2019 JGP France, they narrowly missed the bronze medal by 0.29 points and finished fourth with a personal best. Bronsard/Bouaraguia went on to win bronze at their second event, 2019 JGP Croatia. On winning the medal, they said, "we are happy, but we made a few mistakes, and that encourages us to work even harder." Bronsard/Bouaraguia next won gold at the 2020 Québec Sectionals. Between the JGP series and Sectionals, they made tweaks to their free dance choreography.

Bronsard/Bouaraguia were fourth at the 2020 Skate Canada Challenge. Although they had hoped to compete at the 2020 Winter Youth Olympics in January, they were not chosen and instead competed at the 2020 Canadian Championships. At the Championships, Bronsard/Bouaraguia won their first junior national title ahead of Bashynska/Beaumont and Olivia McIsaac / Corey Circelli.

At the 2020 Bavarian Open in February, Bronsard/Bouaraguia won the silver medal behind Americans Avonley Nguyen / Vadym Kolesnik. Alongside Natalie D'Alessandro / Bruce Waddell and Miku Makita / Tyler Gunara, they earned a spot on the 2020 World Junior Championships team due to their being among the top three Canadian junior ice dance teams at the event. At Junior Worlds, Bronsard/Bouaragauia were eighth after the rhythm dance, but after an 11th-place finish in the free dance, fell to ninth overall. Before the event, the team received praise from Canadian Olympic champion and former Gadbois training teammate Tessa Virtue, who called them her "favourites" and part of the future of Canadian ice dance.

2020–2021 season 
Due to the COVID-19 pandemic, the 2020–21 ISU Junior Grand Prix, where Bronsard/Bouaraguia would have competed, was cancelled. They later withdrew from the virtual Skate Canada Challenge, and the 2021 Canadian Championships were also cancelled.

2021–2022 season 
Bronsard/Bouaraguia participated at a national team camp in early July before they announced their split on July 30, 2021.

Programs 
 With Bouaraguia

Competitive highlights 
CS: Challenger Series; JGP: Junior Grand Prix

With Richmond

With Bouaraguia

Detailed results 
ISU Personal Bests highlighted in bold.

With Richmond

With Bouaraguia

References

External links 
 
 

2004 births
Living people
Canadian female ice dancers
People from Lévis, Quebec
Sportspeople from Quebec